Peter Benton Bart (born July 24, 1932) is an American journalist and film producer, writing a column for Deadline Hollywood since 2015. He is perhaps best known for his lengthy tenure (1989–2009) as the editor in chief of Variety, an entertainment-trade magazine.

Bart was also a co-host, with film producer Peter Guber, of the weekly television series, Shootout (formerly Sunday Morning Shootout), carried on the AMC television channel from 2003 to 2008 and subsequently seen in syndication and in 53 countries around the world.

Early life and education
Bart was born in New York City, the son of Clara (née Ginsberg) and Max S. Bart and raised on Manhattan's Upper West Side. His mother and likely his father were Austrian Jews who emigrated in the early twentieth century, and both worked as public school teachers. His father was strictly irreligious and anti-communist. Bart was educated at Friends Seminary in New York City; Swarthmore College, near Philadelphia, Pennsylvania;  and The London School of Economics and Political Science in London, United Kingdom.

Career
He served as a reporter and columnist for The New York Times and as a reporter for The Wall Street Journal and the Chicago Sun-Times prior to entering the film business.

Starting in 1967, Bart worked as an executive at Paramount Pictures, rising to vice president in charge of production; his relationship with Robert Evans was documented in Evans' autobiography The Kid Stays in the Picture. He played a key role in such films as Rosemary's Baby (1968), True Grit (1969), Harold and Maude (1971), The Godfather (1972) and Paper Moon (1973). After eight years at Paramount he became senior vice president for production at Metro-Goldwyn-Mayer and president of Lorimar Productions, where he was involved in such films as Being There (1979) and The Postman Always Rings Twice (1981). Bart also served as a co-producer on such films as Fun with Dick and Jane (1977) and Islands in the Stream (1977). He also wrote the screenplay for the 1971 film Making It .

He joined Variety as editor-in-chief in 1989. In 2007, Bart appointed Tim Gray to become his successor as editor with the understanding that he would stay on as columnist, blogger and consultant. In April 2009, it was announced that Bart was moving to the position of "vice president and editorial director", characterized online as "Boffo No More: Bart Up and Out at Variety".

In 2001, Los Angeles Magazine reported that Bart had sold the rights to an 86-page novella called Power Play, about "a power struggle between established casino owners and Indian tribes," to Paramount Pictures, where his friend and business associate Robert Evans was a producer. Bart explained he had "probably spent a weekend" adapting the novella from a 108-page script called Crossroaders. The title page of the script showed it had been authored "By Leslie Cox", Bart's wife at the time, "Based on the novel by Peter Bart. September 1996." When asked if he wrote the script himself as well, Bart said he could not remember. Variety policy prohibits staffers from selling scripts, as doing so could generate a conflict of interest given that publication's focus and influence on the Hollywood movie industry, though Bart said he has no problem with staff selling the movie rights to books they have written.

He served as executive producer and screenwriter of the documentary film, Boffo! Tinseltown's Bombs and Blockbusters (2006) shown on the HBO television channel.

Through the years Bart has published eight books, including five non-fiction and three fiction.

He serves on the board of advisors for Penske Media Company.

Personal life
In 1961, he married Dorothy Callman; they had two daughters Colby Bart Centrella (born 1962) and  Dilys Bart Shelton (born 1966). 
His second wife was Leslie Cox. Bart is remarried to the former Phyllis Fredette. His nephew is actor Roger Bart.

Filmography
He was a producer in all films unless otherwise noted.

Film

As writer

Miscellaneous crew

As an actor

Thanks

Television

See also
Variety
Shootout

References

Bibliography
(This list may be incomplete.)

 Destinies, a novel co-written with Denne Bart Petitclerc (Simon & Schuster, 1979)
 Thy Kingdom Come, a novel (Linden, 1981)
 Fade Out: The Calamitous Final Days of MGM, nonfiction (Morrow, 1990).  Refers to the final days of MGM as a historic film studio in Culver City, California. (MGM still exists as a company.)
 The Gross: the Hits, the Flops – the Summer that Ate Hollywood, nonfiction (St. Martin's Press, 1999) (paperback:  St. Martin's Griffin, 2000)  
 Who Killed Hollywood? and Put the Tarnish on Tinseltown, nonfiction (Renaissance, 2000)
 Shoot Out: Surviving the Fame and (Mis)fortune of Hollywood, nonfiction coauthored with Peter Guber (Putnam, 2002)
 Dangerous Company: Dark Tales from Tinseltown, a collection of short stories (Miramax, 2003)
 Boffo! Hollywood in the Trenches: How I Learned to Love the Blockbuster and Fear the Bomb, nonfiction (Miramax, 2006)
 Infamous Players: A Tale of Movies, the Mob (and Sex), nonfiction (Weinstein Books, 2011)

External links
Variety.com, Variety'''s official website
Peterbart.com, Bart's blog (redirects to Bart's blog hosted by variety.com; most recent entry – May 21, 2009)
"The Backlot", index to Bart's weekly column for Variety"Q&A – Peter Bart, Variety Editor-in-Chief", posted by Carolyn Kew (February 14, 2009) at AMC television
Interview with Peter Bart, by Amy Wallace, in Los Angeles magazine
"Peter Bart", Bart's blog at The Huffington Post''

1932 births
Living people
Alumni of the London School of Economics
American film producers
American newspaper editors
Television personalities from Los Angeles
American male screenwriters
American film historians
American male non-fiction writers
American film studio executives
Paramount Pictures executives
Film theorists
American people of Austrian-Jewish descent
Jewish American screenwriters
Writers from Los Angeles
People from the Upper West Side
Swarthmore College alumni
Variety (magazine) editors
Screenwriters from California
Screenwriters from New York (state)
Historians from New York (state)
Historians from California